Do You Realise was the second EP released by the Dublin-based Irish indie–alternative rock band, Delorentos. It was released on 9 November 2007, spending two weeks in the Irish Singles Chart and peaking at #34. The EP contained the tracks "Do You Realise", "Neon (Extended)", "All This Time" and "Circumstance and Chance". New versions of "Neon" and "All This Time" were recorded for the EP during the In Love with Detail sessions, whilst "Circumstance and Chance" was recorded in 2006 with Marc Carolan at an early album demo session in Grouse Lodge in County Westmeath.

Track listing

Chart performance

References

External links 
 Official website
 Tracklisting and cover art
 Chart details

2007 EPs
Delorentos albums